My Animal (1998) is the debut album by American rock band Boy Hits Car.

Background
In 1995, a Baltimore-based independent label booked Boy Hits Car on their first national tour—six weeks straight performing nearly every night. During this time the band decided that no matter what the cost, they would try to make a lifestyle out of performing their music---music they eventually dubbed 'Lovecore'. BHC continued to write, record and tour until 1997 when they landed a deal with a Texas-based independent label.

They recorded their first full-length CD---'My Animal' which was released and distributed in 1998 through NMG music. After only a few weeks, they lost their distribution deal but the band pressed on.

The song "Mr. Loh" is about real-life Malibu man Eugene Loh, who would often do calisthenics on the beach while naked. His daughter, writer Sandra Tsing Loh, has written several times about the incongruity of her father being commemorated in this way. Mr. Loh died on March 1, 2018, at the age of 97.

Track listing
"Hope" – 3:24
"Clear" – 3:58
"I'm a Cloud" – 4:45
"La Playa" – 3:59
"Happy" – 5:12
"Mr. Loh" – 4:57
"Make Me Pure" – 5:18
"Letter from Prison" – 3:03
"Fury 'N' I" – 6:16
"Benkei" – 3:48
"In the Lateness of a Day" – 4:54
"My Animal" – 6:09

References

1998 albums